Ryzkhov is a surname. Notable people with the surname include:

Nikolai Ryzhkov (born 1929), Soviet official and Russian politician
Vladimir Ryzhkov (born 1966), Russian historian and politician
Yevgeniy Ryzhkov (born 1985), Kazakhstani swimmer

See also
Ryzhov

ru:Рыжков